August Zeppenfeld House, also known as the Zeppenfeld-Cain House, is a historic home located in Franklin, Johnson County, Indiana. It was built in 1872, and is a two-story, rectangular, three bay, Italianate style brick dwelling with a one-story frame wing.  One-story frame additions were made to the house about 1910, 1935, and the 1960s.  It features a low hipped roof and arches openings.

It was listed on the National Register of Historic Places in 1987.

References

Houses on the National Register of Historic Places in Indiana
Italianate architecture in Indiana
Houses completed in 1872
Buildings and structures in Johnson County, Indiana
National Register of Historic Places in Johnson County, Indiana